Joshua's Meadows is a historic home located at Bel Air, Harford County, Maryland, United States. It is  a three-part house: the two oldest sections are Flemish bond brick, T-shaped, gable roofed, built about 1750; and the third section is of native fieldstone and dates to 1937. The original house consists of two parts; a main -story  house and a -story  kitchen wing.

Joshua's Meadows was listed on the National Register of Historic Places in 1982.

References

External links
, including photo from 1982, Maryland Historical Trust website

Houses on the National Register of Historic Places in Maryland
Houses in Bel Air, Harford County, Maryland
Houses completed in 1750
Historic American Buildings Survey in Maryland
National Register of Historic Places in Harford County, Maryland